"Has It Come to This?" is a song by English rapper and producer Mike Skinner under the music project the Streets. It was released in October 2001 as the lead single from their debut album Original Pirate Material. The song reached number 18 in the United Kingdom and was certified Silver by the British Phonographic Industry in December 2019.

Critical reception
Upon release, it was reviewed by NME as "the most original, lyrical British rap in memory", charting "an evolutionary route for UK garage". The song spent a total of five weeks on the UK Singles Chart, peaking at #18. Leonie Cooper of NME called the pirate radio call to arms of 'Lock down your aerial' "iconic".

Mixmag included the song in their list of "40 of the best UK garage tracks released from 1995 to 2005".

In November 2016, UK duo Gorgon City compiled a list of their top UK garage songs for Billboard, with "Has It Come to This" at #15.

In September 2019, NME included the song in their "25 essential UK garage anthems" list.

Gemtracks included the song in their list of the "top UK garage songs between 1995–2005".

Track listing
 "Has It Come to This?" (Original Mix)
 "Has It Come to This?" (Zed Bias Vocal Mix)
 "Has It Come to This?" (Jaimeson Mix)
 "Streets Score"

Charts

Certifications

References

External links

2001 songs
2001 debut singles
The Streets songs
UK garage songs
Locked On Records singles
679 Artists singles